Reginald James Hamilton (April 29, 1914 – June 12, 1991) was a Canadian ice hockey player and coach. Hamilton played in the National Hockey League (NHL) with the Toronto Maple Leafs and Chicago Black Hawks between 1935 and 1946. He won the Stanley Cup twice with the Maple Leafs, in 1942 and 1945.

Playing career
Hamilton started his National Hockey League career with the Toronto Maple Leafs in 1935. He would also play with the Chicago Black Hawks for two seasons, 1945–1947. He was a player and head coach of the Kansas City Pla-Mors 1947–48 of the USHL, was the head coach for the Pla-Mors 1948–49, and retired from hockey for a few years before returning to Toronto to take over as the head coach of the Toronto Marlboroughs 1953–54.

Career statistics

Regular season and playoffs

References

External links
 
 

1914 births
1991 deaths
Canadian ice hockey defencemen
Chicago Blackhawks players
Kansas City Pla-Mors players
Ice hockey people from Toronto
Stanley Cup champions
Syracuse Stars (AHL) players
Syracuse Stars (IHL) players
Toronto Maple Leafs players
Toronto Marlboros players
Toronto St. Michael's Majors players